Jamar Cain (born October 1, 1980) is an American football coach and former player.   He has been an assistant coach for various college football programs since 2005.

Coaching career

Early Coaching Career
Cain began his coaching career as a high school coach. He then went on to work as an assistant coach at Sacramento City College. In 2005 he got his first opportunity at the FBS level as a graduate assistant under Frank Solich at Ohio. From  2006 to 2008 he worked as the defensive ends coach for Missouri State. From 2009 to 2012 he was the defensive line coach for Cal Poly.

Wyoming
In 2013 he served as the defensive line coach for Wyoming. He was promoted to defensive coordinator midway through the season.

NDSU
From 2014 to 2016 he worked as the defensive line coach for North Dakota State, winning two championships along the way.

Fresno State
After originally taking a job at San Jose State. In 2017 and 2018 he worked as the defensive line coach for Fresno State.

Arizona State
In 2019 he worked as the defensive line coach for ASU.

Oklahoma
In 2020 and 2021 he worked as the outside linebackers and defensive ends coach for the Sooners.

LSU
After originally following Lincoln Riley to USC. Cain decided to join Brian Kelly's inaugural LSU staff as the defensive line coach and defensive run game coordinator.

References

Living people
North Dakota State Bison football coaches
LSU Tigers football coaches
Oklahoma Sooners football coaches
1980 births